{{Speciesbox
|image = Blachia umbellata-2-mundanthurai-tirunelveli-India.jpg
|genus = Blachia
|species = umbellata
|authority = (Willd.) Baill.
|synonyms = *Blachia reflexa Benth. 
Codiaeum umbellatum (Willd.) Müll.Arg. 
Croton umbellatus Willd.
}}Blachia umbellata'' is a species of plants under the family Euphorbiaceae. It is native to India and Sri Lanka. Trees from this species can grow up to 15m (49 ft) tall. This plant is known as "Kosatta - කොස් අත්ත or කොසට්ට" by Sinhalese people in Sri Lanka.

References

India Biodiversity

Codiaeae
Flora of Sri Lanka
Flora of Asia
Taxa named by Henri Ernest Baillon
Taxa named by Carl Ludwig Willdenow